Kocaali is a town and district of Sakarya Province in the Black Sea Region of Turkey. The mayor is Ahmet Acar (AKP).

KOCAALİ is a district of Sakarya Province. Kocaali should not be confused with KOCAELİ (the province).

The main sources of income, hazelnut, livestock and tourism.

There are 14 km long and 500 meters wide, sandy beach, the sand quality feature class is registered as a world-class 2. Starting south of the Black Sea in the north of the town poured mining Creek. Climate has the characteristics of a typical Black Sea climate. Historically, the Greeks from the mines Mining Stream Şerbetpınarı'nda monastery, known as the current market, established a large village in Bolpazar Bolazar Village in the past. Also on the beach in the county municipality of the district's decision two and a half times the installation of residential and garden nizamlıdır. Two hours, three hours away from Ankara to Istanbul is a new industrial site is being set up and promoted as a municipality for the industrialists.

Melen also spilled into the sea east of the Coppermine River District has. Nehirlerdendir important for tourism. One of the leading rafting areas in the Marmara region of Turkey, is also very suitable for fishing in the river water as drinking water is sent to Istanbul.

Istanbul 40 years to meet the water needs of the Melen project (Melen River) water gets inside the borders of our county.

Nature tourism is also suitable for Çamdağı; Coppermine south of the town. Tourism and culture festival held in the county and international folklore festival shows, swimming hazelnut, hazelnut extract, beach volleyball, football, backgammon, wrestling, wrist wrestling, marathon, eating yogurt and düzenmektedir events such as sack race.

Transportation is available to Kocaali in three ways: by following the direction of Karasu get there from Istanbul after Adapazarı (78 miles), south into Hendek'ten Kocaali'ye get there (50 miles), Ankara, in the direction of the town of Duzce Akcakoca streamed (distance 25 km ).

List of Kocaali's neighborhoods

References

Populated places in Sakarya Province
Districts of Sakarya Province